The Thalie (or Talie) is a short river in Saône-et-Loire, France.

It rises at Rully and runs along Chalon-sur-Saône. After 30.4 km, at Saint-Rémy it joins the Corne, close to its confluence with the Saône.

It has an average discharge of 0.34 m³/s, and its tributaries are the ru Guillot, ruisseau du Bois and ruisseau de Guerlande.

References

Rivers of France
Rivers of Bourgogne-Franche-Comté
Rivers of Saône-et-Loire
Bourgogne-Franche-Comté region articles needing translation from French Wikipedia